LGA 1700 (Socket V) is a zero insertion force flip-chip land grid array (LGA) socket, compatible with Intel desktop processors Alder Lake and Raptor Lake, which was first released in November 2021.

LGA 1700 is designed as a replacement for LGA 1200 (known as Socket H5) and it has 1700 protruding pins to make contact with the pads on the processor. Compared to its predecessor, it has 500 more pins, which required a major change in socket and processor sizes; it is 7.5 mm longer. It is the first major change in Intel's LGA desktop CPU socket size since the introduction of LGA 775 in 2004, especially for consumer-grade CPU sockets. The larger size also required a change in the heatsink fastening holes configuration, making previously used cooling solutions incompatible with LGA 1700 motherboards and CPUs.

Heatsink design 
Since the introduction of Land grid array (LGA)-based sockets in the consumer hardware space in 2004, the thermal solution hole pattern (the distance between centers of the screw-holes for the heatsink) has changed three times for Intel's mainstream platforms:
 For LGA 775, it is 72 mm × 72 mm
 For LGA 1156, LGA 1155, LGA 1150, LGA 1151 and LGA 1200 it is 75 mm × 75 mm
 For LGA 1700, it is 78 mm × 78 mm

While some motherboards do offer additional mounting holes for using older coolers, e.g. for using an LGA115x cooler on an LGA1700 motherboard, differences in Z-height and the mounting pressure will result in worse than expected cooling performance. For best results it is recommended to either change the cooling solution to a model certified for this platform or request an updated mounting-kit for one of the higher-end solutions on the market. For heatsinks to be interchangeable, not only the hole pattern, but also the socket seating plane height, the maximum thermal solution center of gravity height from the IHS and the static total compressive minimum need to match.

Issues 
Even though some CPU cooler manufacturers are providing adapter kits (usually in the form of different screws) to go with existing LGA115x retention brackets, there have been reports of the CPU bending or bowing due to uneven mounting pressure from the LGA 1700 integrated loading mechanism (ILM). This leads to the CPU having reduced contact with the cooler plate, which in turn leads to increased temperatures. LGA 1700 contact frames to replace the stock ILM have been released by Thermal Grizzly and Thermalright to ensure even CPU mounting pressure and cooler contact.

Alder Lake chipsets (600 series)

Raptor Lake chipsets (700 series)

See also
 List of Intel microprocessors
 List of Intel chipsets

References 

Intel CPU sockets